Noemi Stella (born 2 February 1997) is an Italian race walker who won bronze in the 5 km at the 2014 Summer Youth Olympics.

Stella is an athlete of the Centro Sportivo Carabinieri.

Achievements

References

External links
 

1997 births
Living people
Athletes (track and field) at the 2014 Summer Youth Olympics
Italian female racewalkers
Athletics competitors of Centro Sportivo Carabinieri
Sportspeople from the Province of Taranto